The Man Who Loved Yngve is a Norwegian film released on 15 February 2008. It is based on a book of the same name by Stavanger author Tore Renberg. It received critical acclaim as one of the best Norwegian movies of the year.
A sequel - I Travel Alone - was released in 2011 and a prequel - The Orheim Company - followed in 2012.

Plot 
In 1989, in the shadow of the collapse of Communism in Europe, a group of young rural Norwegians form a band. Preparations for their first gig are derailed when the lead singer, Jarle, is smitten by a new arrival, Yngve. Confused and not completely in touch with his own emotions, Jarle neglects his band, his mother and his girlfriend to spend more time with his new crush. At a party after the concert, he lashes out at Yngve but also admits he loves him. Yngve becomes depressed and flees to a bridge with the intention of committing suicide, but decides not to. He ends up in a mental hospital, and stays there until Jarle sees him again, a few weeks after the incident.

Production details 
 Production Company: Motlys A/S
 Producer: Yngve Sæther
 Writer: Tore Renberg
 Distributor: Sandrew Metronome
 Filming start date: 12.02.07
 Filming end date 30.03.07
 Director: Stian Kristiansen
 Music: Kaada and Geir Zahl
 Budget: 15.5 million NKR

Cast 
 Jarle - Rolf Kristian Larsen
 Helge - Arthur Berning
 Yngve - Ole Christoffer Ertvaag
 Katrine - Ida Elise Broch
 Oljeungen - Erlend Stene
 Jarle's father - Jørgen Langhelle
 Andreas - Knut Sverdrup Kleppestø

References

External links 
 

2008 films
2000s Norwegian-language films
Norwegian LGBT-related films
Films scored by John Erik Kaada